Mamá Tingó is a Santo Domingo Metro station on Line 1. It was open on 22 January 2009 as the northern terminus of the inaugural section of Line 1 between Mamá Tingó and Centro de los Héroes. It is currently the northern terminus of the line. The following station is Gregorio Urbano Gilbert.

This is an elevated station built above Avenida Hermanas Mirabal. It is named in honor of Mamá Tingó.

References

Santo Domingo Metro stations
2009 establishments in the Dominican Republic
Railway stations opened in 2009